Maurice Gordon Graham (20 December 1931 – 10 December 2015) was an Australian rugby union player who played one match for the New Zealand national team, the All Blacks, as a guest player against Queensland on the 1960 tour of Australia and South Africa. A fullback, Graham represented New South Wales at a state level, and played for Australian Colts in 1953.

References

1931 births
2015 deaths
People from the Central West (New South Wales)
Australian rugby union players
New Zealand international rugby union players
New South Wales Waratahs players
Rugby union fullbacks
Rugby union players from New South Wales